Chlorosea margaretaria is a species of emerald moth in the family Geometridae. It is found in North America.

The MONA or Hodges number for Chlorosea margaretaria is 7014.

References

Further reading

 

Geometrinae
Articles created by Qbugbot
Moths described in 1944